Crossing Lines is a German-French-Italian-American action crime thriller television series created by Edward Allen Bernero and Rola Bauer.  The series premiered on June 9, 2013, at the screening for the Opening Ceremonies of the 53rd edition of the Festival de Télévision de Monte-Carlo, the first time the festival opened with a television series. Its first television broadcast was in Italy on June 14, 2013, on the public broadcaster's channel Rai 2. Crossing Lines was premiered in the United States on NBC on June 23, 2013. Bernero and Bauer are the show's executive producers. The show was renewed for a twelve-episode second season by TF1, and was released in its entirety on Amazon Prime Instant Video in the United Kingdom on August 15, 2014. NBC did not broadcast the show after the first season. Netflix carried the series' first two seasons, and announced the debut of season three on February 19, 2015. Canada's CBC aired second-season episodes during late-night hours. On 20 February 2015, the show was renewed for a twelve-episode third season. The third season began on September 15, 2015.

Plot
Former New York Police Department officer Carl Hickman's life has fallen apart after he was injured on the job; he has become addicted to morphine and works as a garbage collector at a carnival in the Netherlands. He is recruited to join the International Criminal Court's special crime unit (a fictional unit). Based in The Hague, it investigates a variety of crimes that cross international boundaries. The unit includes an anti–organized crime expert, a covert specialist from Italy, a technical specialist from Germany, a crimes analyst, a human-trafficking specialist from France and a weapons specialist and tactical expert from Northern Ireland.

Cast

Main
 William Fichtner as Carlton "Carl" Hickman (seasons 1–2), Detective First Grade, NYPD from the United States 
 Marc Lavoine as Louis Daniel (seasons 1–2), Major, Direction Centrale de la Police Judiciaire / International Criminal Court from France
 Gabriella Pession as Eva Vittoria (seasons 1–2), Sovrintendente (Sergeant), Nucleo Operativo Centrale di Sicurezza / Sergeant, Europol from Italy
 Richard Flood as Tommy McConnell (seasons 1–2), Detective, Police Service of Northern Ireland from the United Kingdom
 Tom Wlaschiha as Sebastian Berger, Kommissar (Detective), Berliner Polizei from Germany
 Donald Sutherland as Michel Dorn, International Criminal Court from Netherlands
 Moon Dailly as Anne-Marie San (season 1), O.P.J. (Detective), Police Nationale from France
 Genevieve O'Reilly as Sienna Pride (pilot only), Police Inspector, Scotland Yard from the United Kingdom
 Lara Rossi as Arabela Seeger (guest season 1; main seasons 2–3), Inspecteur, Regiokorps Rotterdam Rijnmond from Netherlands
 Goran Visnjic as Marco Constante (season 3), Police Inspector, Milan from Italy
 Elizabeth Mitchell as Carine Strand (season 3), Inspector, Senior Investigator of the International Criminal Court; former Chicago Police Department officer from the United States
 Naomi Battrick as Ellie Delfont-Bogard (season 3), a recent forensic psychologist graduate, Metropolitan Police Service from the United Kingdom
 Stuart Martin as Luke Wilkinson (season 3), Inspector, Metropolitan Police Service from the United Kingdom

Recurring
 Elsa Mollien as Rebecca Daniel (seasons 1–2), International Criminal Court from France
 Klára Issová as Shari (seasons 1–2), a carnival worker from Netherlands
 Karel Roden as Lev Marianski (seasons 1–2), a Russian crime figure 
 Kim Coates as Phillip Genovese (seasons 1–2), a convicted criminal and stalker from the United States
 Rossif Sutherland as Moreau (seasons 1–2), Lieutenant, Prefecture of Police of Paris from France
 Florentine Lahme as Kathrin Eichholtz (seasons 1–2), Hauptkommissarin, Berliner Polizei from Germany
 Marcel Iureș as Alexander Dimitrov (seasons 1–2), a gangland boss and drug dealer from Romania
 Ray Stevenson as Miles Lennon (season 2), Police Superintendent, Scotland Yard from the United Kingdom
 Carrie-Anne Moss as Amanda Andrews (season 2), Detective, NYPD from the United States
 Sophia Myles as Dr. Anna Clarke (season 2), a doctor from the United Kingdom
 Michelle Fairley as Sophie Baines (season 3), Prosecutor, International Criminal Court from the United Kingdom

Production
Crossing Lines was co-commissioned by France's TF1 and Sony for its AXN network of channels. This is Tandem's first one-hour drama series, having previously produced miniseries, as well as its first project since being acquired by StudioCanal in 2012. The first season was filmed in Paris, Nice and Prague, with filming ending in February 2013. Locations in Prague were used for parts of Paris, Italy, the Netherlands, Berlin and Vienna. Audio post-production was done by SoundSquare in Prague while video post-production work was done by Universal Production Partners. Approximately €10 million was spent in the Czech Republic on the production of the first season.

Bernero said that the show would "feel familiar and help viewers find their orientation, but the European locations will make it feel fresh and very new".

Episodes

Series overview

Season 1 (2013)

Season 2 (2014)

Season 3 (2015)

Broadcast 

Crossing Lines airs in Germany on Sat.1 on Thursdays at 9:15 pm, in the United States on NBC on Sundays at 10:00 pm (currently in off-season), in Canada on CBC on Tuesdays at 9:00 pm, in India on AXN every weekday at 9:00 pm (June 2016), and in France on TF1 on Thursdays at 9:00 pm.

In the United Kingdom, the series was released on the LoveFilm platform on October 25, 2013. The second season was released on Amazon Video on August 15, 2014, with all seasons available on the platform as of 2019. It is now being shown on Alibi (2015). All 3 seasons are being shown on Netflix. (May 2018). In November 2020, Ovation announced it had acquired the American broadcast rights to the entire series and it returned to broadcast in the United States on December 7, 2020. The show will air Monday nights at 7 PM ET, with 3 episodes back to back and episodes reran Tuesday afternoons at 4pm ET in the first season. The series returned for the second season on January 11, 2021.

The series is second one to be picked up by the network in US to not finish its American run originally, after Australian series The Code. It also makes it the second series co-produced with and owned by Sony Pictures Television, after the Canadian-Hungarian spy thriller crime drama action series X Company.

Reception
Tom Conroy of Media Life Magazine found the European flavour of the show, seen in such things as travelling by train to various cities, to be a refreshing change from the norm of American shows. He felt that Donald Sutherland was cast purely for the name-recognition factor and that he was given some lines in which he philosophically talks to pigeons as a means of justifying the cost of casting him. Overall, Conroy found it an "unimaginative procedural" that, despite its title, "generally colors within the lines". David Wiegand of the San Francisco Chronicle also found the location to be what sets Crossing Lines apart. He felt the presence of Donald Sutherland was a benefit to the show. Joanne Ostrow of Heritage Newspapers felt the show to be a "contrivance for foreign sales more than a serious drama".

Crossing Lines has been criticised as misrepresenting the International Criminal Court's nature and purpose, which, in reality, only has jurisdiction over crimes against humanity, war crimes and genocide. The International Criminal Court lacks an organization comparable to the special crime unit, and has no police force of its own. Kevin Jon Heller, Associate Professor & Reader in international criminal law at the University of Melbourne, noted the show creates unacceptable misconceptions about the court's power and the way it operates, which depends on states consenting to its jurisdiction through ratification of the Rome Statute and co-operating with the court to provide resources required to perform investigations and prosecutions.

Without all the shooting, Crossing Lines is more closely related to the special crimes investigations unit of the first International Criminal Tribunal at The Hague in the Netherlands. These crime investigators from all over the world do indeed operate across national jurisdictional lines in connection with major crimes such as murder, rape, torture and kidnapping that occurred in the territory of the former Yugoslavia. John Cencich's The Devil's Garden: A War Crimes Investigator's Story (Potomac Books, Washington, D.C.) demonstrates how police investigators from Germany, France, Belgium, the United Kingdom, Italy, the United States, and many others worked pursuant to the authority of the United Nations Security Council, without relying on national police forces, to investigate and bring to justice some of the world's worst criminals.

See also 
 Criminal Minds: Beyond Borders—an American crime television series featuring an international-based detective squad
 FBI: International—an American crime television series featuring a Europe-based detective squad

References

External links
 Official Facebook page
 Crossing Lines at NBC
 Crossing Lines at Tandem Communications
 

2013 American television series debuts
2015 American television series endings
2010s American crime drama television series
French crime television series
2013 German television series debuts
2015 German television series endings
Television shows set in the Netherlands
English-language television shows
CBC Television original programming
NBC original programming
Television series by Tandem Productions
Television series by Sony Pictures Television
Television series created by Edward Allen Bernero
Sat.1 original programming
Works about the Russian Mafia